Justice Merrell may refer to:

Homer Merrell (1845–1916), justice of the Wyoming Supreme Court
Stanley W. Merrell (1876–1921), justice of the Ohio Supreme Court

See also
Justice Merrill (disambiguation)